Gelastocera castanea is a moth of the family Nolidae first described by Frederic Moore in 1879. It is found in India, Brunei and Sundaland.

References

Nolidae